Joseph Martin Stephens (23 July 1887 – 25 November 1935) was an  Australian rules footballer who played with St Kilda in the Victorian Football League (VFL).

Family
The son of Samuel Stephens (1838–1892), and Jane Stephens (1844–1923), née Moyle, Joseph Martin Stephens was born at Queenscliff, Victoria on 23 July 1887.

Football

North Melbourne (VFA)
He played six senior matches for North Melbourne.

Williamstown (VFA)
Cleared from North Melbourne, he played one game for Williamstown, against Brunswick on 30 April 1910.

Preston (VFA)
On 18 May 1910 he was cleared from Williamstown to Preston.

St Kilda (VFL)
On 28 April 1911 he was cleared from Preston to St Kilda.

He played the first of his eight senior matches, against Geelong, at the Junction Oval on 29 April 1911, and the last, against Collingwood, at Victoria Park on 17 June 1911.

Death
He died (suddenly) in Melbourne on 25 November 1935.

Notes

References

External links 
 
 
 J. Stephens, at The VFA Project.

1887 births
1935 deaths
Australian rules footballers from Victoria (Australia)
St Kilda Football Club players